The 1986 FIS Ski Flying World Ski Championships took place on 8–9 March 1986 at Kulm in Bad Mitterndorf, Austria. The venue had previously hosted the 1975 Ski Flying World Championships.

It was the first time a nation won more than one medal at the same championships, with host nation Austria earning gold and silver in the event. For the second and final time, the championships were held in consecutive years (1972 and 1973 being the others). These championships have been held in even-numbered years since this one.

The event is notorious for three massive accidents which occurred due to dangerous wind conditions.

Individual

Medal table

References
 (Neuländer listed in results incorrectly as being from Finland rather than Austria.)

External links
Coverage from ABC Sports on YouTube

FIS Ski Flying World Championships
1986 in ski jumping
1986 in Austrian sport
March 1986 sports events in Europe
Ski jumping competitions in Austria
Sport in Styria